The Immaculate Conception Catholic Church and Cemetery near Peach Grove, Kentucky, was built in 1860 or 1861.  It was added to the National Register of Historic Places in 1987.  The church is also known as Stepstone Church.

The church is a one-story front-gabled clapboard building, built of log joists and rough-cut boards on a fieldstone foundation.  It has a wooden cupola with a louvered vent, topped by an iron ball and cross.

References

Roman Catholic churches in Kentucky
Churches on the National Register of Historic Places in Kentucky
Roman Catholic churches completed in 1861
National Register of Historic Places in Pendleton County, Kentucky
1861 establishments in Kentucky
19th-century Roman Catholic church buildings in the United States